This is a list of notable motorsports athletes that have competed in the Dakar Rally. This list includes drivers, riders, co-drivers and mechanics.

Drivers

Gallery

References

Lists of sportspeople
Dakar Rally